Aude Jessemin was a French artist born on February 22, 1937, and who died May 8, 2022, in Tours.

Jessemin was active as a painter with the Lettrist group from 1962 to 1969, and on her own a bit later, as well as being one of the first female artists of this movement, with Maggy Mauritz and also Micheline Hachette.

References

1937 births
Living people
Lettrism
20th-century French women artists
21st-century French women artists